Hello There, Universe is an album by American pianist, vocalist and composer Mose Allison released on the Atlantic label in 1970.

Reception

Allmusic awarded the album 3 stars with its review by Scott Yanow calling it "a gap-filler rather than an essential recording".

Track listing
All compositions by Mose Allison except as indicated
 "Somebody Gotta Move" – 2:13
 "Monsters of the Id" – 4:53
 "I Don't Want Much" – 2:37
 "Hello There, Universe" – 3:48
 "No Exit" – 3:39
 "Wild Man on the Loose" – 2:24
 "Blues in the Night" (Harold Arlen, Johnny Mercer) – 4:52
 "I'm Smashed" – 2:53
 "Hymn to Everything" – 6:17
 "On the Run" – 2:17

Personnel 
Mose Allison – piano, organ, vocals
Jimmy Nottingham, Richard Williams – trumpet
Jerome Richardson – flute, alto saxophone
Joe Farrell (tracks 1, 3–7, 9 & 10), Joe Henderson (tracks 2 & 8) – tenor saxophone
Pepper Adams (tracks 1, 2, 8 & 9) Seldon Powell (tracks 3–7 & 10) – baritone saxophone
Bob Cranshaw (tracks 2 & 8), John Williams (tracks 1, 3–7, 9 & 10)  – bass
Joe Cocuzzo – drums

References 

1970 albums
Mose Allison albums
Atlantic Records albums
Albums produced by Joel Dorn